The Budini (Ancient Greek: Βουδίνοι; Boudínoi) was a group of people (a tribe) described by Herodotus and several later classical authors. Described as nomads living near settled Gelonians, Herodotus located them east of the Tanais river (which is usually assumed to correspond with modern Don River) beyond the Sarmatians.

Pliny the Elder mentions the Budini together with the Geloni and other peoples living around the rivers which drain into the Black Sea from the north. During the European Scythian campaign of Darius I, in which the Persian king invaded the Scythian lands of Eastern Europe, the Budini were allies of the Scythians. During the campaign, he captured and burnt down one of the Budini's large fortified cities.

The Budini are also mentioned by Classical authors in connection with reindeer. Both Aristotle and Theophrastus have short accounts – probably based on the same source – of an ox-sized deer species, named tarandos (τάρανδος), living in the land of the Budines in Scythia, which was able to change the colour of its fur to obtain camouflage. The latter is probably a misunderstanding of the seasonal change in reindeer fur colour.

Herodotus' description 
Herodotus gives the following account:

Historicity, origin and location
The definitive origin or the ethnic composition of Budini - if they indeed existed as a singular entity Herodotus and later authors had described - remains unknown.

Slavic Origin
He considered the latter to be ethnically proto-Slavic, and, together with Boris Grakov, further theorised that, considering the probable, relatively large, population numbers of the Budini, which he inferred from the archeological evidence, the Budini must have inhabited a relatively large territory, likely stretching from Voronezh forest steppe to Poltava forest steppe. However, he also did not rule out a possible relation with proto-Balts. He also suggested the Budini had cults dedicated to Lada, a goddess of Balto-Slavic mythology.

On the other hand, who also argued that they were proto-Slavic, determined their location at the time of Herodotus to be between the middle Dnepr and the upper reaches of Don river stretching further up to the limits of the Volga river basin.

Zbigniew Gołąb argued that they were a confederation of people who spoke the Proto-Slavic language, from which Greeks inferred their name which was an exonym meaning "tribesmen" in their native language.

Several historians and scholars such as Lubor Niederle and Pavel Jozef Šafárik believe that the Budini were a Slavic people, and that the etymology stems from the Slavic word for 'water' which is "Voda". Same as Water in English, Votic in Finnish, Vatten in Swedish.

Finnic Origin 
The 1911 edition of Encyclopaedia Britannica surmises that the Budini were Finnic peoples, of the Permian branch now represented by the Udmurts and Komis.

Estonian amateur historian and nationalist Edgar V. Saks identifies Budini as the Finnic Votic people, a theory Urmas Sutrop described as "pseudoscientific".

Other theories see in them the ancestors of the Finns, or the ancestors of Mordvins or Permians.

See also 
 Gelonians
 Gelonus
 Budini and Votyaks
  - a prominent archeological site in what is now north-eastern Ukraine. The remains of this 5th century BC settlement are usually associated with Budini.

References

Sources

Ancient peoples
Scythia
Tribes described primarily by Herodotus